is a downloadable social game in the SaGa series from Square Enix. The game was released on the GREE platform on September 18, 2012 and on Mobage and NTT DoCoMo on November 28, 2013. It was shut down on April 28, 2017. In Emperors SaGa, players  take the role of the emperor of a nation, and guide the country as its ruler.

Gameplay
The game features a combat system utilizing digital playing cards. The game itself is free, and players purchase packs of cards for the game with real money. Those cards represent allies that the player can use to battle enemies. The game can be accessed on Japanese smartphones and feature phones by going to a website hosted by GREE.

Story
Players run their own kingdom as the emperor, craft a unique history, and save the world from an unprecedented crisis. Situations, characters and villains from past SaGa games are present.

Development
 
Takehiro Ando, a Square Enix executive in charge of social games, said that adapting the SaGa series to a mobile social game was difficult, especially since he grew up with the original games and did not want to upset longtime fans with too many changes.

Pre release
The trademark for the title Emperor SaGa was registered by Square Enix in September 2010. The game itself was announced at the 2011 Tokyo Game Show. GREE, the Japanese social platform, merged with OpenFeint in 2012, and Emperors SaGa was listed as a title that would be featured on the service. The artwork was designed by Tomomi Kobayashi. Square Enix ran a promotion pre-release that if players registered for the game before it came out, they received a rare in-game card, Andromache. The title is freemium, downloadable for free but allowing a player to purchase more content with in app purchases. The game was produced by GREE, the Japanese gaming social network.

Reception
Michael Baker of RPGamer heavily disliked the game when he played a demo of it. He found that much of the plot he saw was directly taken from earlier games like Romancing SaGa 2 and Romancing SaGa 3, that the gameplay consisted mainly of clicking on links, and the iPhone game was not responsive to input.  1UP.com listed the game as one of five classic Japanese mobile games unlikely to come to North America.

References

External links
Official Square Enix Japanese teaser site

2012 video games
Mobile games
SaGa
Japan-exclusive video games
Video games developed in Japan